Dean Anderson (born July 14, 1966) is a Canadian former ice hockey goaltender who was an All-American for Wisconsin.

Career
Anderson began attending the University of Wisconsin–Madison in 1984 and became the ice hockey team's starting goaltender as a freshman. In his sophomore season, Anderson shared the starting role with Mike Richter, a future NHLer, and was relegated to backup duties as a junior. Richter left after 1987 to pursue a professional career, leaving Anderson a chance to reclaim the primary job. Anderson was tremendous in his final season, setting a program record with 30 wins and being named an All-American. Anderson led the team to the WCHA Championship and was named Tournament MVP, the first time the award was ever given. Wisconsin won their first round match in the NCAA  Tournament but fell in the quarterfinal round.

Because of his spectacular renaissance, Anderson was selected by the Toronto Maple Leafs in the 1988 Supplemental Draft and joined the team's farm system the following year. Anderson didn't have much success in 1989, allowing more than 6 goals per game in what few appearances he was allowed. He showed a marked improvement the following year, but it was in 1991 when it appeared he had caught on to the professional game. Anderson led the Knoxville Cherokees to a regular season ECHL title, boasting the best save percentage in the league. He was named a First-Team All-Star and even got a brief recall to the Newmarket Saints. Unfortunately, Anderson had a terrible season in 1992, seeing his goals against average balloon to more than five and a half goal per game. He retired after the season.

Statistics

Regular season and playoffs

Awards and honors

References

External links

1966 births
Living people
AHCA Division I men's ice hockey All-Americans
Canadian ice hockey goaltenders
Ice hockey people from Ontario
Sportspeople from Oshawa
Wisconsin Badgers men's ice hockey players
Newmarket Saints players
Flint Spirits players
Knoxville Cherokees players
Toronto Maple Leafs draft picks
National Hockey League supplemental draft picks